Uma Gajapathi Raju is an Indian politician and a former member of Indian Parliament. She was born at Palghat, Kerala on 17 November 1953. She was educated at Madras University. She married Pusapati Ananda Gajapathi Raju on 18 August 1971. They had 2 daughters. They divorced in 1989 and she married film maker Ramesh Sharma in 1991. Anand Ganapathi Raju died in 2016.

She is a political and social worker. She was joint secretary of Andhra Pradesh Congress Committee for one year. Anand Gajapathi Raju, Uma's then husband, was a minister in N T Rama Rao's ministry in AP. But in 1989, he resigned from TDP to join Congress before Uma successfully contested Lok Sabha election the same year. She was elected to the 9th Lok Sabha, in 1989, from Visakhapatnam (Lok Sabha constituency) as a member of Indian National Congress. She was a member of the Consultative Committee, Ministry of Information and Broadcasting in 1990. In 1991 Lok Sabha polls, she came second in Visakhapattanam to the TDP candidate.

She was  vice-president of All India Women's Hockey Federation; vice-chairperson, Organising Committee, Freedom Run and Marathon; member, Nehru Cricket Club;  vice-president, National Institute of Social Action and National Red Cross Society;

She is interested in flood and drought relief work, promotion of orphanage activities, environment protection and malaria eradication programmes.

She was director of the Trade Fair Authority of India.; member of the Film Festival Selection Committee for International Film Festival, 1989; member of the Cultural Sub-Committee, Nehru Implementation Committee.
She joined the board of Moving Picture Co India Ltd in 1989 and resigned from the board in 2010. She has been anchor for 8 years of the prime time news program on Doordarshan called India This Week. She has been executive producer of many award-winning documentaries, including the Emmy-nominated film The Journalist and the Jihadi – The Murder of Daniel Pearl, directed by her husband Ramesh Sharma.

Her daughter, Sanchaita Gajapathi Raju, was appointed spokesperson of Delhi unit of BJP in 2018. Sanchaita was also the former Chairman of Simhachalam temple trust board and MANSAS (2020-21)

References

External links
 Biodata of Uma Gajapathi Raju at Lok Sabha website.

India MPs 1989–1991
1951 births
Indian National Congress politicians from Andhra Pradesh
People from Visakhapatnam district
Living people
Lok Sabha members from Andhra Pradesh
People from Palakkad district
Women in Andhra Pradesh politics
Telugu politicians
20th-century Indian women politicians
20th-century Indian politicians